The Tri-State League was the name of six different circuits in American minor league baseball.

History
The first league of that name played for four years (1887–1890) and consisted of teams in Ohio, Michigan and West Virginia.

The second league, played from 1904–1914, and had member clubs in Delaware, New Jersey and Pennsylvania.

The League contested its 1904 championship game in Philadelphia between York and Williamsport and attracted 3,500 fans to the Phillies' ball park

Charles F. Carpenter was president from 1906 to 1913.

During the 1920s, two versions of the Tri-State League briefly existed: a 1924 loop with clubs in Iowa, Nebraska and South Dakota, and a 1925–1926 association located in Tennessee, Mississippi and Arkansas.

In the late 1930s another iteration existed for two years, composed of six teams from Wisconsin, Illinois and Indiana in its first season, and just four teams excluding Indiana in its second.

The most recent incarnation of the league was the post-World War II Tri-State, a Class B circuit with clubs in Tennessee, North Carolina and South Carolina. This league, which played from 1946–1955, typically included clubs in Charlotte, Asheville, Knoxville, Rock Hill and Spartanburg; most of its teams were affiliated with Major League Baseball farm systems.

The attendance crisis in the minor leagues of the 1950s—and the defection of clubs like Charlotte to higher-classification loops—eventually took its toll on the Tri-State League. In its last season, 1955, there were only four clubs in the league. Its last champion was the Spartanburg Peaches, an affiliate of the Cleveland Indians.

There were teams in southern Maryland that played in a "Tri-State League" in at least the 60s, 70s, and the 80s. There was a team called the Pomonkey Giants associated with a Pomonkey social club in Pomonkey Maryland. They played teams in Berry Road near La Plata, Maryland and in Hughesville among others. It was very much a rural league and almost totally black players. The team is mentioned in the obituary of a player and coach, George Dyson, Jr in 2020.

One of the most extensive discussions of this Tri-State League explains how integration of Major League baseball led to the demise of the Negro leagues.  It became neighborhood baseball.

Teams

1887
 Played as Ohio State League

1888–1890

Akron Akrons (1890)
Canton (1888, 1890)
Canton Nadjys (1889)
Columbus Senators (1888)
Dayton Reds (1889–1890)
Hamilton (1889)
Jackson Jaxons (1888)
Kalamazoo Kazoos (1888)
Lima Lushers (1888)
Mansfield Pioneers (1890)
McKeesport Tubers (1890)
Sandusky Fish Eaters (1888)
Springfield (1889–1890)
Toledo Maumees (1888)
Wheeling Nail Cities (1888)
Wheeling Nailers (1889–1890)
Youngstown Giants (1890)
Zanesville Kickapoos (1888)

1904–1914

Allentown (1912–1914)
Altoona Mountaineers (1904–1909)
Altoona Rams (1910–1912)
Atlantic City (1912–1913)
Camden (1904)
Chester (1912)
Harrisburg Senators (1904–1914)
Johnstown Johnnies (1905–1908)
Johnstown Jawns (1909)
Johnstown Johns (1910–1912)
Lancaster Red Roses (1905–1912, 1914)
Lebanon (1904)
Reading Pretzels (1907–1912, 1914)
Shamokin (1905)
Trenton Tigers 1907–1914
Williamsport Millionaires (1904–1910)
Wilmington Peaches (1904–1908)
Wilmington Chicks (1911–1914)
York Penn Parks (1904)
York White Roses (1905–1907, 1909–1914)

1924
Beatrice Blues
Grand Island Islanders
Hastings Cubs
Norfolk Elk Horns
Sioux City Cardinals
Sioux Falls Canaries

1925–1926
Blytheville Tigers (1925–1926)
Corinth Corinthians (1925–1926)
Dyersburg Deers (1925)
Jackson Giants (1925)
Jackson Jays (1926)
Jonesboro Buffaloes (1925–1926)
Sheffield-Tuscumbia Twins (1926)
Tupelo Wolves (1925–1926)

1938–1939
 Chicago Harley Mills (1938–1939)
 Elgin All-Stars (1938)
 Fort Wayne Harvesters (1938)
 Madison Blues (1938–1939)
 Sheboygan Chairmakers (1938–1939)
 Spencer Coals (1938–1939)

1946–1955

Anderson A's (1946)
Anderson Rebels (1947–1954)
Asheville Tourists (1946–1955)
Charlotte Hornets (1946–1953)
Fayetteville Cubs (1947–1948)
Florence Steelers (1948–1950)
Gastonia Rockets (1952–1953)
Greenville Spinners (1951–1952, 1954–1955)
Greenwood Tigers (1951)
Knoxville Smokies (1946–1952, 1954)
Reidsville Luckies (1947)
Rock Hill Chiefs (1947–1955)
Shelby Cubs (1946)
Spartanburg Spartans (1946)
Spartanburg Peaches (1947–1955)
Sumter Chicks (1949–1950)

References

External links
 Baseball Reference – Tri-State League (Class B) Encyclopedia and History
Baseball Reference – Tri-State League (Class D) Encyclopedia and History
Baseball Reference – Western Tri-State League (Class D) Encyclopedia and History

Tri-State League
Baseball leagues in Ohio
Baseball leagues in Michigan
Baseball leagues in West Virginia
Baseball leagues in Delaware
Baseball leagues in New Jersey
Baseball leagues in Pennsylvania
Baseball leagues in Iowa
Baseball leagues in South Dakota
Baseball leagues in Nebraska
Baseball leagues in Wisconsin
Baseball leagues in Illinois
Baseball leagues in Indiana
Baseball leagues in Tennessee
Baseball leagues in North Carolina
Baseball leagues in South Carolina
Baseball leagues in Maryland